Sir Peter Llewellyn Gwynn-Jones  (12 March 1940 – 21 August 2010) was a long-serving Officer of Arms at the College of Arms in London.  He was Garter Principal King of Arms, the senior English officer of arms, from 1995 to 2010.

Life and career
Gwynn-Jones was born in 1940, the son of Major Jack Gwynn-Jones, of Cape Town. He was educated at Wellington College, and Trinity College, Cambridge, where he obtained an MA. In 1970 he joined the College of Arms and became assistant to Sir Anthony Richard Wagner, who was the Garter Principal King of Arms. In 1973 Gwynn-Jones was appointed Bluemantle Pursuivant of Arms in Ordinary. In 1982 he was promoted to herald, and served until 1995 as Lancaster Herald of Arms in Ordinary and became House Comptroller of the College of Arms. In 1995 he was appointed Garter Principal King of Arms,. He retired in 2010. He died later that year on 21 August.

Appointments and honours
Gwynn-Jones was Secretary of the Harleian Society from 1981 until 1994, Inspector of Regimental Colours from 2 October 1995, and Inspector of Royal Air Force Badges from 1996. He was also appointed in 1995 Genealogist to the Order of the Bath, Genealogist of the Order of St Michael and St George, and Genealogist of the Most Venerable Order of the Hospital of Saint John of Jerusalem.  He was non-executive Vice-President of The Heraldry Society from 1996.

Gwynn-Jones was appointed Lieutenant of the Royal Victorian Order (LVO) in 1994, promoted Commander of the Royal Victorian Order (CVO) in 1998, and appointed Knight of Justice of the Most Venerable Order of the Hospital of Saint John of Jerusalem (KStJ) in 1995. In anticipation of his retirement The Queen promoted Gwynn-Jones Knight Commander of the Royal Victorian Order (KCVO) in the 2010 New Year Honours.

The Coati Sable
Gwynn-Jones's autobiography, The Coati Sable: The Story of a Herald, was published by The Memoir Club in 2010, coinciding with his retirement as Garter The title is a reference to the coati (a type of American raccoon) that featured on Gwynn-Jones's own coat of arms and served as a punning allusion to Coity, Glamorganshire.

Arms

See also
Heraldry
Officer of Arms
Pursuivant
King of Arms

Bibliography
Gwynn-Jones, P. Ll. (1998) The Art of Heraldry : origins, symbols, designs, London : Parkgate, 
Gwynn-Jones, P. Ll. (2010) The Coati Sable: The story of a Herald, Durham : The Memoir Club,

References

External links
The College of Arms
CUHAGS Officer of Arms Index
Obituary

1940 births
2010 deaths
English officers of arms
People educated at Wellington College, Berkshire
Alumni of Trinity College, Cambridge
Knights Commander of the Royal Victorian Order
Knights of Justice of the Order of St John
English genealogists
English male non-fiction writers
Garter Principal Kings of Arms